Barbara Irene Kazmierczak is an American microbiologist. She is the Gustavus and Louse Pfeiffer Research Foundation MD-PhD Program Director at the Yale School of Medicine. Kazmierczak is also a professor of medicine and professor of microbial pathogenesis.

Career
Kazmierczak joined the faculty at Yale School of Medicine in 2001. The next year, she was the recipient of the 2002 Donaghue Investigator Program award from the Donaghue Medical Research Foundation for her research on how human cells respond to disease-causing bacteria.

In 2014, she was named Director at the Yale Medical Scientist Training Program, replacing James D. Jamieson. By 2019, Kazmierczak was appointed to the  Gustavus and Louise Pfeiffer Research Foundation M.D.-Ph.D. Program Director endowed professorship. She was also elected a fellow of the American Academy of Microbiology and named president of the National Association of MD-PhD Programs and chair of the AAMC's GREAT Group MD-PhD Steering Committee.

References 

Living people
Place of birth missing (living people)
Yale School of Medicine faculty
American women academics
American microbiologists
University of Chicago alumni
Rockefeller University alumni
Weill Cornell Medical College alumni
20th-century American scientists
20th-century American women scientists
21st-century American scientists
21st-century American women scientists
Year of birth missing (living people)